Peperomia caperata, the emerald ripple peperomia, is a species of flowering plant in the family Piperaceae, native to Brazil.

It is a popular houseplant, and numerous cultivars have been developed, of which 'Luna Red' has gained the Royal Horticultural Society's Award of Garden Merit.

References

External links
 The Internet Peperomia Reference

House plants
caperata